Cuprina fuscella is a moth in the Stathmopodidae family. It was described by Sinev in 1988. It is found in Austria and eastern Siberia.

The larvae feed on Onoclea sensibilis.

References

Natural History Museum Lepidoptera generic names catalog

Moths described in 1988
Stathmopodidae